Paracetopsis bleekeri is a species of whale catfish endemic to Ecuador where it occurs in the Guayas River basin in the southwest.  This species grows to a length of 24.2 cm (9.5 inches).

References 
 

Cetopsidae
Fish described in 1862
Fish of South America
Freshwater fish of Ecuador